Roland "Champ" Bailey Jr. (born June 22, 1978) is an American former professional football player who was a cornerback in the National Football League (NFL). He played college football for the Georgia Bulldogs, where he earned consensus All-American honors, and was drafted by the Washington Redskins in the first round of the 1999 NFL Draft.

In 2004, Bailey was traded to the Denver Broncos, where he played for ten seasons until he was released in early 2014, following the Broncos' Super Bowl XLVIII loss. Bailey signed by the New Orleans Saints shortly afterward but was released before the start of the regular season. In October 2014, Bailey announced his retirement from the NFL after 15 seasons. He was selected to 12 Pro Bowls in his career, the most ever for a cornerback. He holds the current NFL record for most passes defended, with 203. In 2019, he was elected to the Pro Football Hall of Fame in his first year of eligibility. Bailey is widely considered one of the greatest cornerbacks in NFL history and "the top cornerback of his era."

Early years
Bailey was born in Fort Campbell, Kentucky and grew up in Folkston, Georgia, where he was a three-sport athlete (football, basketball, track) at Charlton County High School. His two brothers, Ronald and Boss Bailey, also played football at Charlton County and the University of Georgia. Champ's first two seasons at Georgia overlapped with Ronald's last two seasons; Champ then played his final season alongside Boss. Ronald went on to sign with the NFL's Dallas Cowboys but suffered a career-ending injury. Boss played linebacker in the NFL for the Detroit Lions from 2003 to 2007, then joined Champ on the Denver Broncos in 2008.

At Charlton County High School, Bailey recorded 3,573 rushing yards, 58 rushing touchdowns, 13 100-yard rushing games, and 1,211 passing yards on 74 completions. On defense he recorded eight interceptions, while on special teams he returned 26 kickoffs for 731 yards and 22 punts for 318 yards. His total offensive yardage was 5,855 with 394 points scored. He still holds school records for season rushing yards (1,858), season rushing touchdowns (28), season scoring (180), and single-game rushing (417 yards), while also tying the record for single-game rushing touchdowns.

College career
Bailey received an athletic scholarship to attend the University of Georgia, where he played for the Georgia Bulldogs football team from 1996 to 1998. He was regarded as one of college football's greatest multiple threats (offense, defense, and special teams) in his three seasons as a Bulldog. In his final year at Georgia, he registered 52 tackles (four for losses), three interceptions, seven passes deflected, 47 catches for 744 yards (15.8 avg.), five touchdowns, 84 yards rushing on 16 carries, 12 kickoff returns for 261 yards and four punt returns for 49 yards. He averaged 103.5 all-purpose yards per game and logged 957 plays (547 defense, 301 offense, and 109 special teams) on the way to earning consensus first-team All-America and first-team All-Southeastern Conference honors and claiming the Bronko Nagurski Trophy as the nation's top defensive player. Against the Virginia Cavaliers in the Peach Bowl, he caught three passes for 73 yards, including a 14-yard touchdown, rushed three times for nine yards, returned five kickoffs for 104 yards, returned a punt 12 yards, and posted two tackles and one pass defended at cornerback. In three years at Georgia, he played 33 games (24 starts) and recorded 147 total tackles, two fumble recoveries, one forced fumble, eight interceptions and 27 passes defended. He was an All-SEC first-team selection as a sophomore, starting every game at left cornerback and one game at wide receiver.

Track and field
Bailey was also a standout track and field athlete at Georgia; he ran the 55 meters and 60 meters, recording personal bests of 6.35 seconds and 6.85 seconds, respectively. He also competed in long jump and triple jump.

Professional career

1999 NFL Draft
Bailey was drafted with the seventh overall pick in the first round of the 1999 NFL Draft by the Redskins. He was the first ever drafted player to come from his hometown of Folkston, Georgia.

Washington Redskins
On July 24, 1999, Bailey signed a 5-year, $12 million contract including a $2 million signing bonus. Bailey quickly established a reputation as one of the league's best defensive backs. He was a large presence on the Redskins defense and benefited from time spent with eventual Hall of Fame cornerback teammates Deion Sanders and Darrell Green. After the 2003 season, Bailey's contract with the Redskins expired and he threatened to boycott training camp if the club exercised the franchise tag. In a surprising move, the Redskins gave Bailey permission to seek a trade.

Denver Broncos
Prior to the 2004 season, Bailey was traded to Denver along with a second-round draft pick for Clinton Portis.

On September 12, 2004, during the NFL's opening Sunday Night Football game of the season, Bailey intercepted his first pass as a Denver Bronco.

On January 14, 2006, in a divisional playoff game against the New England Patriots, he broke the record for the longest non-scoring play in NFL history at the time. With the Patriots near the goal line, he intercepted a pass from quarterback Tom Brady in the end zone and returned it 100 yards to the New England one-yard line before he was tackled by New England's Benjamin Watson.

In 2006, Bailey had 10 interceptions (tied for best in the NFL with Patriots cornerback Asante Samuel) and did not give up a touchdown during the season. Bailey, San Diego Chargers running back LaDainian Tomlinson and Miami Dolphins defensive end Jason Taylor were unanimous choices for the NFL All-Pro team. Following the season's conclusion, Bailey finished second in voting for NFL Defensive Player of the Year.

In 2009, Bailey did not allow a touchdown in 80 passes thrown his way that year, played on 98% of the snaps and remained one of the best-tackling cornerbacks in the game.

On September 15, 2009, Bailey was chosen for the Broncos 50th Anniversary team by the Denver community. This team was honored during the halftime show of the Legacy game versus the Patriots on October 11.

In 2010, Bailey matched up against some of the NFL's best wideouts. He held Dwayne Bowe to no catches on 2 targets. The Arizona Cardinals only completed 3 passes on him for 19 yards in a game where he matched up with Larry Fitzgerald. Bailey was selected to play in his record-breaking 10th Pro Bowl. No cornerback in NFL history has been to more.

It was announced on February 22, 2011 by the Broncos vice president of football operations, John Elway, that Bailey was re-signed to a 4-year contract.

During the 2012 offseason, Bailey was named the 46th-best player in the NFL by the league's network, NFL Network.

In 2012, Bailey was named an All-Pro for the 7th time of his career and was selected to the 2013 Pro Bowl. The Pro Bowl selection was his 12th, extending the record he set for trips by a cornerback, and tied the record for most Pro Bowls played, along with Randall McDaniel and Will Shields.

During the 2013 offseason, Bailey was named the 53rd-best player in the NFL by his peers on the league's network, NFL Network.

During the course of the 2013 season, Bailey was limited to a career-low 5 games with a foot injury; however, Bailey returned in time for the playoffs and held his own when fellow cornerback, Chris Harris, was ruled out for the remainder of the season after a torn ACL. Bailey played in his first Super Bowl at Super Bowl XLVIII in which he had 4 tackles in a 43–8 loss to the Seattle Seahawks.

On March 6, 2014, the Denver Broncos released Bailey.

New Orleans Saints
On April 4, 2014, Champ Bailey signed a two-year, $7 million contract with the New Orleans Saints. Bailey failed to make the final roster and was released by the team on August 30, 2014.

Retirement
Bailey announced his retirement from professional football on October 18, 2014.
On November 14, 2014, it was announced that Bailey would sign a one-day contract with Denver to allow him to officially retire as a Bronco.

Pro Football Hall of Fame
On February 2, 2019, Bailey was elected to the Pro Football Hall of Fame in his first year of eligibility. He was enshrined on August 3, 2019, during a ceremony in Tom Benson Hall of Fame Stadium.

Personal life 
Bailey married his wife, Jessica, at the Pelican Hill resort in Newport Beach, California in 2014.

NFL career statistics

NFL records
 Most Pro Bowl selections for a defensive back (12)
 Most passes defended (203)
 Longest interception return in a postseason game without scoring (100 yds) (vs New England Patriots, 1/14/06)
 Youngest player to intercept 3 passes in a game (21) (at Arizona Cardinals, 10/17/99)

Pro Bowl records
 Most career interceptions in Pro Bowl (4)

References

External links

1978 births
Living people
African-American players of American football
All-American college football players
American Conference Pro Bowl players
American football cornerbacks
American football wide receivers
Denver Broncos players
Georgia Bulldogs football players
National Conference Pro Bowl players
New Orleans Saints players
People from Charlton County, Georgia
People from Christian County, Kentucky
Players of American football from Georgia (U.S. state)
Washington Redskins players
Pro Football Hall of Fame inductees
21st-century African-American sportspeople
20th-century African-American sportspeople